Moving Mountains is a 1985 solo album by Justin Hayward of The Moody Blues, released on Towerbell Records. It was later re-released on CD and cassette in June 1989 with one bonus track, "The Lights Are Low".

Track listing
All tracks composed by Justin Hayward; except where indicated

Side One
"One Again" - 4:36
"Take Your Chances" - 3:47
"Moving Mountains" - 4:49
"Silverbird" (Justin Hayward, Jeff Wayne) - 7:37

Side Two
"Is It Just a Game" - 4:41
"Lost and Found" - 4:16
"Goodbye" - 3:47
"Who Knows" - 3:39
"The Best Is Yet to Come" (Clifford T. Ward) - 3:53

1989 CD and Cassette Bonus Tracks
"The Lights Are Low" - 4:39

Personnel
P.P. Arnold, Vicki Brown - Backing Vocals
Colin Fletcher, Pete Wingfield - Keyboards
Eric Stewart - Keyboards, Engineer on "Goodbye"
Tony Visconti - Keyboards, Programming, Backing Vocals
Justin Hayward - Acoustic & Electric Guitars, Keyboards, Vocals
Jo Partridge - Lead & Rhythm Guitars
Henry Thomas - Bass
Dave Mattacks, Charlie Morgan - Drums, Percussion
Chris White - Saxophone

Production
Arrangements By Peter Knight & Jeff Wayne
Produced By Tony Visconti, Jeff Wayne & Martin Wyatt
Recorded & Engineered By John Kurlander, Steve McLaughlin & Tony Visconti
Digital Mastering By Justin Hayward, Steve Hoffman & Martin Wyatt

Charts

References

External links
[ allmusic entry] Retrieved April 3, 2010
discogs entry for "Moving Mountains" Retrieved April 3, 2010

1985 albums
Justin Hayward albums
Albums produced by Tony Visconti
Albums arranged by Peter Knight (composer)